Giorgio Cantarini (born 12 April 1992) is an Italian actor who, to date, has appeared in two Academy Award winning films: Life Is Beautiful (1997) and Gladiator (2000).

Early life
Raised in Orvieto, Italy, Giorgio Cantarini was born to Giuseppe Cantarini and Giovanna Martini. The couple separated after Giorgio's fifth birthday. His family nickname is "Gio".

Career
Cantarini made his film debut in the 1997 Roberto Benigni directed comedy-drama Life is Beautiful, playing Benigni's four-year-old son 'Giosuè Orefice', who is sent with his Jewish-Italian father to a German concentration camp during World War II. The film won three Academy Awards. In 1998, Cantarini was nominated alongside his Life Is Beautiful castmates  for the Screen Actors Guild Award for Outstanding Performance by a Cast in a Motion Picture and the same year he won the Young Artist Award.

His second film appearance was in the 2000 Ridley Scott-directed period action/drama Gladiator. Giorgio was cast as the son of Oscar winner Russell Crowe's character 'Maximus'. 

In 2001, Cantarini appeared in the Hallmark Hall of Fame American television film adaptation of author Eric Newby's autobiographical novel Love and War in the Apennines (retitled In Love and War) as 'Slavko'. 

In 2005, Cantarini competed in the second season of Ballando con le Stelle, the Italian reality television version of the series Dancing With The Stars.

In January 2020, he appeared in the show "Lions don't hug" at the Hudson Guild Theater in Chelsea, New York.

Personal life
Cantarini currently resides in New York City, where he is studying and performing.

Filmography

References

External links

1992 births
Italian male film actors
Italian male child actors
Living people
20th-century Italian male actors
21st-century Italian male actors